Quincy is a city in and the county seat of Gadsden County, Florida, United States. The population was 7,970 as of the 2020 census. Quincy is part of the Tallahassee metropolitan area.

History

Early Florida Statehood and Antebellum Years

Established in 1828, Quincy is the county seat of Gadsden County, and was named for John Quincy Adams. Quincy's economy was based on agriculture, including farming tomatoes, tobacco, mushrooms, soybeans and other crops.

According to The Floridian newspaper, in 1840 there were two schools in Quincy, the Quincy Male Academy and the Quincy Female Academy. Joshua Knowles published the Quincy Sentinel in Quincy from November 1839 until it relocated to Tallahassee and became the Florida Sentinel in 1841. The paper began publishing in Tallahassee in February or March 1841 as a successor to Quincy Sentinel.

American Civil War
William Tennent Stockton, once mayor of Quincy, raised a cavalry company following secession called the Gadsden Dragoons. He was subsequently appointed as captain of the 1st Florida Cavalry Regiment.

Tobacco
In 1828, Governor William P. Duval introduced Cuban tobacco to the territory of Florida. As a result, the culture of shade-grown cigar wrapper tobacco was a dominant factor in the social and economic development of Gadsden County. Tobacco is a native plant of the western hemisphere. Early European explorers discovered Native Americans growing the plant when they set foot on their soil.

In 1829, John Smith migrated to Gadsden County in covered wagons with his family and four related families. Since there was already a resident named John Smith in the community, he became known as John "Virginia" Smith. When Smith ventured southward he brought with him a type of tobacco seed which was used for chewing and pipe smoking. He planted that seed and found that the plants grew vigorously. Because there was no market for tobacco in small quantities, it was twisted together, cured and shared with his friends. He purchased some Cuban tobacco seed and planted them with his Virginia tobacco. Several years passed and the two tobaccos blended.

When the Virginia tobacco was grown in Florida soil, it was much thinner and lighter in color. Smith began saving the seed from the hybridized stalks. From these seeds, a new plant known as "Florida Wrapper" was developed. So began a tobacco industry at a time when the South was suffering from the low price of cotton.

Growing tobacco continued to be profitable until the beginning of the Civil War in 1861, even when the European markets were no longer available. Of course, during the war and the Reconstruction Era, very little tobacco was grown except for personal use. Those days were tremendously difficult, and recovery was a slow process. The post-war search for a money crop led to the resurgence of the tobacco culture. Through these experiments it was discovered that tobacco which was light in color and silky in texture demanded the highest prices. With more experimentation, shading the plants began. At first, wood slats were used, but these proved too heavy. Then they tried slats draped with cheesecloth to keep the plants from the light. Next came ribbed cheesecloth. Ultimately in 1950, the white cheesecloth was replaced with a treated, longer lasting, yellow cloth that provided perfect shade.

Colonel Henry DuVal, president of the Florida Central and Peninsular Railroad, shipped samples of Gadsden County tobacco to New York for leaf dealers and cigar manufacturers to inspect. Soon representatives of several companies came down from New York to purchase land for growing tobacco. There was such an influx of land purchases that a number of packing houses arose. This continued until 1970 when tobacco companies came under fire and demand diminished. Around 1970, growing tobacco declined substantially in Gadsden. The development of a homogenized cigar wrapper, the ever-increasing cost of production, the subsidizing of the tobacco culture in Central America by the U.S. government, and the increasing, negative legal climate against the tobacco industry have added to the demise of Gadsden's future in tobacco. The last crop of shade-grown cigar wrapper tobacco was grown in 1977.

Quincy then turned to its other crops, tomato, mushroom and egg farms. This continued until the close of Quincy's mushroom factory and massive layoff of workers at Quincy's tomato farm in 2008. Quincy now turns to its businesses and is attempting to build itself into a business-based district.

Race relations

Lynchings
In 1929, Will Larkins was accused of an attack on a white 13 year old Quincy school girl, for which he was quickly indicted. As Larkins was being transferred he was taken by a mob of 40 masked men from Sheriff Gregory of Gadsden county, near Madison and Live Oak. When he was kidnapped by the mob he was being taken to the Duval county jail in a series of moves that newspapers claimed were for his safe keeping. After his capture by the mob Larkins was carried back to Quincy, near the railroad grade crossing, shot to death and hanged with wire, his body was then dragged through the street tied to an automobile and burned at the area where the mob thought the accused committed his crime. Though Governor Carlton promised an inquiry and investigators were put on the case in late 1929, no mention of Will Larkins, except for the NAACP lynching lists of 1929, is made again in newspapers of the time. Larkins was the third man lynched in Florida that year.

In 1941, A. C. Williams was accused of robbery and the attempted rape of a 12 year old white girl. The account of the details makes the accusation very improbable, but Williams did not live long enough to be tried for the crime. He was kidnapped from jail by a group of white men, and although they both shot him and hanged him, Williams survived. After learning he was alive, the sheriff formed a search party. His family was aware the sheriff had been involved in the lynching, and hid him. Unfortunately, Williams needed medical attention and since the hospitals in the Quincy area would not treat a black person, he needed to be transported to Florida A&M University in Tallahassee. The following day a group of masked men kidnapped him from the ambulance and killed him. His body was dumped on his mother's porch.

Resistance to Jim Crow
In the 1920s, blacks in Quincy including A. I. Dixie repeatedly tried to form political organizations and vote, and protest brutal labor conditions, but were suppressed by violence from whites. Dixie was flogged repeatedly for his efforts. Later, in 1964, Dixie hosted Congress of Racial Equality student activists, while his daughter Linda organized a sit-in, and Jewell Dixie became the first African American to run for Gadsden County Sheriff.

All American City
In 1996, Quincy was recognized as an All American City.

Geography
Quincy is located in central Gadsden County at  (30.59, –84.58), in the rolling hills of North Florida.

Climate

Demographics

2020 census

As of the 2020 United States census, there were 7,970 people, 2,657 households, and 1,714 families residing in the city.

By age, the population was split as such: 6.7% were under 5 years old, 27.8% were under 18 years old, and 13.8% were 65 years and older. 49.5% of the population were female. There were 370 veterans living in Quincy and 11.2% of the population were foreign born persons. 

The median value of owner-occupied housing units were $78,600. The median gross rent was $681. 76.3% of the households had a computer and 54.7% had a broadband internet subscription. 72.1% of the population 25 years and older were highschool graduates and 16.9% of that same population had a Bachelor's degree or higher. The median household income was $31,756. The per capita income in a 12 month period was $17,117. 43.6% of the population lived below the poverty threshold.

Arts and culture

Museums and other points of interest

Several locations in Quincy have been included in the National Register of Historic Places, most within the boundary of the Quincy Historic District. They are:

 E. B. Shelfer House
 E. C. Love House
 John Lee McFarlin House
 Judge P. W. White House
 Old Philadelphia Presbyterian Church
 Quincy Library
 Quincy Woman's Club
 Stockton-Curry House
 Willoughby Gregory House

The Gadsden Arts Center, an AAM accredited art museum housed in the renovated 1912 Bell & Bates hardware store, with rotating regional & national art exhibitions and a permanent collection of Vernacular Art, is also situated in the Quincy Historic District.

Also notable is the Leaf Theater, which is considered a "historic cinema treasure." It is also said to be haunted.

The North Florida Research and Education center is on Pat Thomas Parkway in Quincy.

The Florida A&M Research and Extension Center is located on Old Bainbridge Road in the St. John community of Quincy.

Media
Quincy has two local papers that cover all of Gadsden County, The Gadsden County Times of Gadsden County and The Herald of the city of Havana, Florida.

Education

The Gadsden County School District operates area public schools.

 Carter-Parramore Academy School
 Chattahoochee Elementary School 
 Crossroad Academy Charter School 
 Gadsden Central Academy School
 Gadsden County High School
 Gadsden Elementary Magnet School
 Gadsden Technical Institute School
 George W. Munroe Elementary School
 Greensboro Elementary School
 Havana Magnet School
 James A. Shanks Middle School
 Stewart Street Elementary School
 West Gadsden Middle School

In 2003 James A. Shanks High School in Quincy and Havana Northside High School consolidated into East Gadsden High School. In 2017 East Gadsden High became the only zoned high school in the county due to the consolidation of the high school section of West Gadsden High School into East Gadsden.

Robert F. Munroe Day School, a K–12 private school which was founded as a segregation academy, has its kindergarten campus, the Robert F. Munroe Day Kindergarten, in Quincy proper. The main campus for grade 1–12 in nearby Mount Pleasant.

The Gadsden County Public Library system operates the William A. "Bill" McGill Public Library.

Transportation

Highways

U.S. Route 90 (Jefferson Street) is the main highway through the city; US 90 leads southeast  to Tallahassee and northwest  to Chattahoochee. I-10 leads east  to Tallahassee and west  to Pensacola.

Other highways in Quincy include SR 12, which leads  to Havana and southwest  to Bristol; SR 267, which leads north  to the Georgia line and south 8 miles to Wetumpka; and SR 268, which leads southeast  to Midway.

Transit
Shuttle-bus and van transportation between Quincy and Chattahoochee, Havana, and Tallahassee is provided by Big Bend Transit, which operates three routes serving the area.

Railroad
Freight service is provided by the Florida Gulf & Atlantic Railroad, which acquired most of the former CSX main line from Pensacola to Jacksonville on June 1, 2019.

Airport

Coca-Cola

Quincy investors were largely responsible for the development of its local Coca-Cola company into a worldwide conglomerate. Quincy was once rumored to be home to many millionaires due to the Coca-Cola boom. Mark Welch “Mr Pat” Munroe, a local banker, father of 18 children by two wives, and W.C. Bradley were among the stockholders of three of the banks that released 500,000 shares of new Coca-Cola common stock. They urged widows and farmers to invest for $40 each, and several did. Eventually that stock split, and made as many as 67 accounted-for investors and Gadsden County residents rich. A single share of Coca-Cola stock bought in 1919 for $40 would be worth $6.4 million today, if all dividends had been reinvested.

Notable people

 Nat Adderley Jr. (born 1955), music arranger who spent much of his career with Luther Vandross
 Elizabeth Whitfield Croom Bellamy (1837–1900), writer 
 The Lady Chablis (1957–2016), born Benjamin Edward Knox, transgender entertainer best known for her appearance in the book and subsequent movie adaptation of Midnight in the Garden of Good and Evil
 Billy Dean (born 1962), country music singer
 Freddie Figgers (born 1989), electronics inventor and entrepreneur
 Mack Lee Hill (1940–1965), football player and American Football League All-Pro RB for the Kansas City Chiefs
 Willy Holt (1921–2007), French-American film production designer and art director
 Dexter Jackson (born 1977), football player and Super Bowl XXXVII MVP
 Nathan Kellogg McGill, attorney who represented The Chicago Defender and served on the Chicago Library board in Chicago, Illinois
 Jerrie Mock (1925–2014), first woman to fly solo around the world
 Willie Simmons (born 1980), head coach of the Florida A&M Rattlers football team

Gallery

References

External links
 
 City of Quincy official website
 Virtual Tour of Quincy
 City-Data.com, comprehensive statistical data about Quincy

Cities in Gadsden County, Florida
County seats in Florida
Tallahassee metropolitan area
Cities in Florida
1828 establishments in Florida Territory
Populated places established in 1828